A number of steamships have been named Kenton.

, a British cargo ship torpedoed and sunk in 1941
, a British cargo ship in service 1947–50

Ship names